Alovudine (fluorothymidine) is an antiviral agent which was being developed by Medivir.  It was discontinued after a Phase II trial in 2005 due to toxicity.  It is a DNA polymerase inhibitor.

See also 
 Fluorothymidine F-18, an isotopically enriched version of alovudine used as a PET tracer

References 

Antivirals
Pyrimidinediones
Organofluorides
Abandoned drugs